Buried is a conceptual and performative work of critical, social and political content by artist Abel Azcona. The performance artwork was created in 2015 through a public and participatory performance, or happening, on the esplanade of Franco's Monument to the Fallen in Pamplona. Azcona invited dozens of relatives of Republicans who were shot, persecuted or disappeared during the Spanish Civil War. Descendants of victims make up the installation in a row in front of the monument, all symbolically buried with soil from the garden of one of the participants, where his relatives had been shot. In 2016 the city of Pamplona invited Azcona to show his work inside the Monument and the project was recreated inside the Monument, which had been converted into an exhibition hall, under the name of Unearthed: A retrospective view on the political and subversive work of the artist Abel Azcona. The exhibition brought together the Buried project and fragments of all of Azcona's works.

In 2016, Azcona coordinated a new performative action, or happening, with relatives of those who were shot in the Pozos de Caudé. Under the name of Desafectos, Azcona formed a wall with the relatives as a complaint, next to the wells outside the city of Teruel, where more than a thousand people had been shot and thrown into the wells over the course of three days during the Civil War.

Bibliography

See also 

 Performance Art
 Installation
 Endurance art

References

Performances